Succinea putris is a species of small air-breathing land snail in the family Succineidae, the amber snails.

Description

The 10-17 (27)  x 6-8 mm has  3-4 whorls. These are relatively flat and with shallow sutures. The body whorl is massive and the aperture is much greater than 50% of shell height. The spire is small. In color the shell is amber yellow. The visible soft parts are yellow with a reddish hue, which becomes lighter downwards to the sides. The animal can also be dark grey.

Distribution
The distribution of this species is Palearctic, in the Euro-Siberian region, including the following countries and islands:

 Belgium
 Czech Republic 
 Germany
 Netherlands
 Poland
 Ukraine
 Russia
 Canada
 Slovakia
 Bulgaria
 Great Britain
 Ireland
 Estonia

Habitat
This species lives in very damp places, such as on vegetation on river banks and marshes.

Life cycle
The lifespan of Succinea putris in laboratory conditions is 13 to 17 months.

Parasites

Parasites and parasitoids of this species include the trematodes Leucochloridium macrostomum and L. paradoxum, and the fly Pherbellia punctata.

References

External links

Succinea putris at Animalbase taxonomy,short description, distribution, biology,status (threats), images

Succineidae
Palearctic molluscs
Gastropods described in 1758
Taxa named by Carl Linnaeus